Joplin is a unincorporated community and census-designated place (CDP) in Liberty County, Montana, United States. The population was 157 at the 2010 census.

History
It was founded by Joseph E. Rehal, an American businessman of Syrian descent. It was a station house on the Great Northern Railway as early as 1902.

Train derailment

Three people were killed and 50 more were injured when the eight rear cars of the ten-car train derailed.

Geography
Joplin is located on the eastern edge of Liberty County at  (48.560363, -110.770255). It is bordered to the east by Inverness in Hill County. U.S. Route 2 runs along the southern edge of Joplin, leading west  to Chester, the Liberty county seat, and east  to Havre.

Demographics

For statistical purposes, the United States Census Bureau has defined this community as a census-designated place (CDP).

As of the census of 2000, there were 210 people, 91 households, and 66 families residing in the CDP. The population density was 166.6 people per square mile (64.4/km2). There were 105 housing units at an average density of 83.3 per square mile (32.2/km2). The racial makeup of the CDP was 99.52% White, 0.48% from other races. Hispanic, or Latino of any race were 1.90% of the population.

There were 91 households, out of which 22.0% had children under the age of 18 living with them, 64.8% were married couples living together, 7.7% had a female householder with no husband present, and 26.4% were non-families. 24.2% of all households were made up of individuals, and 13.2% had someone living alone who was 65 years of age or older. The average household size was 2.31, and the average family size was 2.70.

In the CDP, the population was spread out, with 22.4% under the age of 18, 5.7% from 18 to 24, 23.8% from 25 to 44, 25.2% from 45 to 64, and 22.9% who were 65 years of age or older. The median age was 43 years. For every 100 females, there were 110.0 males. For every 100 females age 18 and over, there were 96.4 males.

The median income for a household in the CDP was $38,281, and the median income for a family was $40,625. Males had a median income of $28,750 versus $17,500 for females. The per capita income for the CDP was $24,014. About 4.6% of families and 4.4% of the population were below the poverty line, including none of those under the age of 18 and 5.6% of those 65 or over.

Education
The former Joplin School was closed in 2005 when the consolidated Chester-Joplin-Inverness public school district was formed. The school district serves students from Kindergarten to 12th grade.

Joplin Schools consolidated with Inverness, MT in the early 1980s to form J-I school before it consolidated with the Chester School District. The 1974 graduating class was 18 students.

Notable people
 Joseph E. Rehal - founder of Joplin, Montana

References

Census-designated places in Liberty County, Montana
Census-designated places in Montana